Mount Pleasant is a neighborhood on the East Side of Cleveland, Ohio. It borders the neighborhoods of Buckeye–Shaker and Buckeye–Woodhill to the north, Kinsman to the west, Union–Miles Park to the south, and the suburb of Shaker Heights and the Lee–Harvard neighborhood of Cleveland's Lee–Miles area to the east. The neighborhood has been home to numerous ethnic groups, first Manx immigrants, then Germans, Czechs, Russians, Jews, and Italians. Today, it is a predominantly African American neighborhood. Together with Buckeye–Shaker, it is politically part of Cleveland's Ward 4.

References

Neighborhoods in Cleveland